Tito Alonso (1926–1979) was an Argentine film actor.

Career

Alonso entered film in 1940 at the age of 14 in El Inglés de los güesos

In 1947 he appeared in A sangre fría. Alonso worked consistently in Argentine film throughout the 1950s, 60s and 1970s appearing in the 1964 popular film Aconcagua amongst many others.

Alonso also appeared in the 1974 film Agentes Secretos Contra Guante Verde.

He made a number of appearances on TV in Argentina in the late 1960s and 1970s until his premature death in 1979 aged 53.

Filmography

1940s
The Englishman of the Bones (1940)
White Eagle (1941)
Los chicos crecen (1942, aka The Kids Grow Up) (International: English title)
Malambo (1942)
María Celeste (1945)
Éramos seis (1945)
Savage Pampas (1945) - Chango
El Misterio del cuarto amarillo (1947)
A sangre fría (1947, aka In Cold Blood) (International: English title: informal literal title) - Hijo del Dr. Morel
Mis cinco hijos (1948)
Apenas un delincuente (1949) ... aka Hardly a Criminal (International: English title) - Carlos Moran
From Man to Man (1949)

1950s
Filomena Marturano (1950)
Arrabalera (1950)
 The Path to Crime (1951)
La Última escuadrilla (1951)
Sala de guardia (1952)
Fierro a fondo (1952)
Ellos nos hicieron así (1952)
Yo soy el criminal (1954, aka Emergency Ward (International: English title))
El Cura Lorenzo (1954)
Sinfonía de juventud (1955)
Los Torturados (1956) - Ernesto Mario Bravo
Goleta austral (1956)
Una Cita con la vida (1958)
Procesado 1040 (1958, aka Prisoner 1040) (International: English title)) .... El Potrillo
Campo virgen (1959)
Campo arado (1959)

1960s
Interpol llamando a Río (1961)
Une blonde comme ça (1962, aka A Blonde Like That) (International: English title)
Aconcagua (1964)
Canuto Cañete y los 40 ladrones (1964)
Psique y sexo (1965)
Los Tímidos visten de gris (1965)
La Buena vida (1966)
Romeo y Julieta (1966, TV Movie)
Turismo de carretera (1968)
Un Pacto con los brujos (1969, TV Series) - Commissary Ferreyra

1970s
Nino, las cosas simples de la vida (1971, TV Series) (aka Nino) (Argentina: short title) - Donato
Juan Manuel de Rosas (1972) - Pedro de Angelis
Nino (1972) (aka Las Cosas simples de la vida) (Argentina)
La Mala vida (1973) - Sheriff
Agentes Secretos Contra Guante Verde (1974)
Novia de vacaciones (1979, TV Series) - Carmelo

External links
 

Argentine male film actors
1926 births
1979 deaths
Place of birth missing
20th-century Argentine male actors
Argentine male television actors
Male actors from Buenos Aires